Branimir Bajić (Cyrillic: Бранимир Бајић; born 19 October 1979) is a Bosnian former professional footballer who played as a defender.

Club career
After playing for Radnik Bijeljina, Bajić was transferred to Partizan in July 2000. He scored a 90th-minute goal to give his team a 1–0 win over Rapid Wien in the first leg of the 2001–02 UEFA Cup first round. In May 2004, Bajić extended his contract with Partizan for another four years. He subsequently won his third championship with the club in the 2004–05 season. In February 2006, Bajić was loaned for six months to Emirati club Al Wahda with an option for a permanent deal. He eventually returned to Partizan and played regularly for the side in the 2006–07 season.

In June 2007, Bajić moved to Germany and signed with TuS Koblenz, on a three-year deal. He spent the next two seasons at the club, before transferring to Denizlispor in July 2009. After one year in Turkey, Bajić returned to Germany and signed with MSV Duisburg. On 9 May 2018, it was announced that he will leave Duisburg at the end of the 2017–18 season. After the season, he announced his retirement.

International career
Bajić made his debut for Bosnia and Herzegovina in an August 2004 friendly match against France and has earned a total of 21 caps, scoring no goals. His final international was an August 2008 friendly against Bulgaria.

In September 2008, citing his dissatisfaction with the atmosphere in the national team following Ćiro Blažević's arrival at the helm of Bosnia and Herzegovina, in an interview for Sportski žurnal daily, Bajić announced his retirement from international football at the age of 28.

Couple of days later in Dnevni avaz newspaper, Bajić denied giving an interview to Sportski žurnal and announcing his international retirement.

Honours
Partizan
 First League of FR Yugoslavia: 2001–02, 2002–03, 2004–05
 FR Yugoslavia Cup: 2000–01

References

External links

1979 births
Living people
People from Bijeljina
Serbs of Bosnia and Herzegovina
Association football defenders
Bosnia and Herzegovina footballers
Bosnia and Herzegovina international footballers
FK Radnik Bijeljina players
FK Partizan players
Al Wahda FC players
TuS Koblenz players
Denizlispor footballers
MSV Duisburg players
Premier League of Bosnia and Herzegovina players
First League of Serbia and Montenegro players
UAE Pro League players
Serbian SuperLiga players
2. Bundesliga players
Süper Lig players
3. Liga players
Bosnia and Herzegovina expatriate footballers
Expatriate footballers in Serbia and Montenegro
Bosnia and Herzegovina expatriate sportspeople in Serbia and Montenegro
Expatriate footballers in the United Arab Emirates
Bosnia and Herzegovina expatriate sportspeople in the United Arab Emirates
Expatriate footballers in Serbia
Bosnia and Herzegovina expatriate sportspeople in Serbia
Expatriate footballers in Germany
Bosnia and Herzegovina expatriate sportspeople in Germany
Expatriate footballers in Turkey
Bosnia and Herzegovina expatriate sportspeople in Turkey